The 2013–14 Abbotsford Heat season was the American Hockey League franchise's fifth and final season in the city of Abbotsford, British Columbia.

Off-season
After a year in the North Division, the Abbotsford Heat was moved to the newly renamed West Division, formerly the South Division, under an AHL realignment in the summer of 2013. The team lost their top leading scorers from the previous season in centres Ben Walter and Krys Kolanos, as well as forwards Dustin Sylvester, Roman Horák and Tyler Ruegsegger; defenseman Mike Matczak, and goaltender Leland Irving. Fourteen players from the previous season returned to the Abbotsford lineup for 2013–14, but the new roster also included several new young players. Newcomers included forwards Steve Begin, Markus Granlund, Josh Jooris, Micheal Ferland, Corban Knight and Ben Hanowski; goaltenders Laurent Brossoit and Joni Ortio; and defencemen Chad Billins, John Ramage, Tyler Wotherspoon Dean Arsene, and Pat Sieloff, who at age 19 was youngest player in AHL at that time. Head coach Troy Ward felt the team had good enthusiasm, pacing, discipline and puck management, and that with few veteran players, the entire team would have to put forward an equal effort.

Defenceman Mark Cundari and centers Greg Nemisz and Paul Byron were re-signed in the off-season, but winger Ryan Howse was suspended by the Calgary Flames organization for failing to report to training camp. The ECHL's Alaska Aces signed a one-year contract affiliating themselves with Calgary and Abbotsford during the off-season, and Brandon Astle named the Heat's new play-by-play broadcaster and media relations coordinator after having spent five seasons with the Langley Rivermen of the British Columbia Hockey League. After starting their training camp on September 20, Abbotsford played a single preseason game on October 22, winning 5–2 against the Utica Comets after Brett Olson opened the scoring in the first 94 seconds. Hanowski scored two goals and an assist, while Olson also recorded two assists. The game included seven fights and 104 total penalty minutes distributed.

|- align="center" bgcolor="#cfc"
| 1 || September 27 || Utica || 2–5 || Abbotsford || || Ortio || 0–1–0–0
|-

Regular season

October
The Heat opened the season by splitting a pair of games against the Lake Erie Monsters on October 4 and 5, winning the first game after scoring three goals in seven minutes. Hanowski scored twice, and goaltender Reto Berra stopped 31 shots in his North American debut. Abbotsford lost the second match-up 3–2 in a game that included four fights and 74 penalty minutes. The Heat next split a pair of home games against the Milwaukee Admirals, winning their home opener in overtime on October 11, and losing the next day in a shootout where no Abbotsford skaters scored and Berra gave up two of four Milwaukee shots. The Heat started a three-game road trip with a 4–3 loss to the Oklahoma City Barons on October 18 after giving up a 4–0 lead in the first 24 minutes of the game. Abbotsford played the Barons again the next day, winning 2–1 in a shootout after Berra made 29 saves and Byron tied the game with 37 seconds left in regulation and the goaltender pulled.

The Heat suffered their worst loss of the season to date with a 9–3 loss to the Texas Stars after giving up eight unanswered goals, including six in the third period. Dallas winger Colton Sceviour scored a hat-trick against them. After splitting two games against Lake Erie on October 25 and 26, Abbotsford next went on a seven-game winning streak, tying a franchise record for consecutive wins, starting with a 5–4 win against Utica on October 30 after Knight scored 3:30 into overtime. After allowing three goals in nine shots in the first period, Berra was pulled from the net for Ortio, who stopped 17 of 18 shots. Blair Jones' assist on the game-winner started a six-game point streak for the centre. Billins, who led the Heat in goal-scoring at five, was called up to Calgary after the month was out.

November
Abbotsford started the month with a 4–3 win over Utica, with Jones scoring the game-winning breakaway goal with less than five minutes left in the game. Berra was called up to the Flames on October 2, forcing the Heat to take the unusual step of signing David Harris, the forty-year-old goaltending coach of Ontario Junior Hockey League's Newmarket Hurricanes, to an emergency contract to serve as the Heat's back-up goalie for their game that night. Abbotsford won that game 3–2 against the Hamilton Bulldogs after Ortio made 35 saves and stopped all three shootout attempts. The Heat scored all three of their shootout shots from Granlund, Knight and Jones, who had also scored two regulation goals. Afterward, Joey MacDonald, a veteran goaltender with experience in 129 NHL games, cleared waivers and joined the Abbotsford roster. Abbotsford started a four-game homestead with a 2–1 win over the San Antonio Rampage on November 5, with Ortio earning his fourth straight win and Granlund scoring his third goal in four games.

The Heat beat San Antonio again the next day, but the Rampage forced overtime after fighting back from a 2–0 deficit in the final six minutes of regulation. MacDonald, in his first start with the Heat, made 29 saves and stopped all four shootout shots, while Street and Jones scored in the shootout for Abbotsford. Billins was returned to the Heat on November 9, and recorded points in two consecutive wins over the Toronto Marlies on November 9 and 10. Winger Micheal Ferland scored his first two professional goals in the first game, a 4–3 victory, and the Heat won the second game 6–3 after scoring three unanswered goals in the final period, including a successful penalty shot by Granlund.

Relocation
The 2013–14 season was the last season for the franchise to play in the British Columbia, as Abbotsford's city council announced that they had bought out the remaining years of the city's lease with the Flames for $5.5 million. With 3,007 fans per game, the Heat finished second-last in AHL attendance, and owing to a deal that guaranteed the Flames a minimum level of income, the team's attendance struggles cost the city $12 million total since the arrival of the Heat in 2009.

On April 15, 2014, the city of Abbotsford terminated the contract with the Heat, and on May 5, 2014 The AHL's board of governors announced its approval to relocate the team to Glens Falls, New York, for the 2014–15 season to play as the Adirondack Flames.

Standings

Conference standings

Schedule and results

|- style="text-align:center; background:#cfc;"
| 1 || October 4 || Abbotsford || 5–2 || Lake Erie || || Berra || 12,123 || 1–0–0–0 || 2 || Gamesheet
|- style="text-align:center; background:#fcc;"
| 2 || October 5 || Abbotsford || 2–3 || Lake Erie || || Berra || 6,289 || 1–1–0–0 || 2 || Gamesheet
|- style="text-align:center; background:#cfc;"
| 3 || October 11 || Milwaukee || 2–3 || Abbotsford || OT || Berra || 3,413 || 2–1–0–0 || 4 || Gamesheet
|- style="text-align:center; background:#ffc;"
| 4 || October 12 || Milwaukee || 2–1 || Abbotsford || SO || Berra || 1,814 || 2–1–0–1 || 5 || Gamesheet
|- style="text-align:center; background:#fcc;"
| 5 || October 18 || Abbotsford || 3–4 || Oklahoma City || || Berra || 2,680 || 2–2–0–1 || 5 || Gamesheet
|- style="text-align:center; background:#cfc;"
| 6 || October 19 || Abbotsford || 2–1 || Oklahoma City || SO || Berra || 2,783 || 3–2–0–1 || 7 || Gamesheet
|- style="text-align:center; background:#fcc;"
| 7 || October 20 || Abbotsford || 3–9 || Texas || || Brossoit || 5,630 || 3–3–0–1 || 7 || Gamesheet
|- style="text-align:center; background:#cfc;"
| 8 || October 25 || Lake Erie || 2–4 || Abbotsford || || Berra || 1,947 || 4–3–0–1 || 9 || Gamesheet
|- style="text-align:center; background:#fcc;"
| 9 || October 26 || Lake Erie || 3–1 || Abbotsford || || Berra || 2,168 || 4–4–0–1 || 9 || Gamesheet
|- style="text-align:center; background:#cfc;"
| 10 || October 30 || Abbotsford || 5–4 || Utica || || Ortio || 2,500 || 5–4–0–1 || 11 || Gamesheet
|- style="text-align:center; background:;"

|- style="text-align:center; background:#cfc;"
| 11 || November 1 || Abbotsford || 4–3 || Utica || || Ortio || 3,169 || 6–4–0–1 || 13 || Gamesheet
|- style="text-align:center; background:#cfc;"
| 12 || November 2 || Abbotsford || 3–2 || Hamilton || SO || Ortio || 4,253 || 7–4–0–1 || 15 || Gamesheet
|- style="text-align:center; background:#cfc;"
| 13 || November 5 || San Antonio || 1–2 || Abbotsford || || Ortio || 1,364 || 8–4–0–1 || 17 || Gamesheet
|- style="text-align:center; background:#cfc;"
| 14 || November 6 || San Antonio || 2–3 || Abbotsford || SO || MacDonald || 1,389 || 9–4–0–1 || 19 || Gamesheet
|- style="text-align:center; background:#cfc;"
| 15 || November 9 || Toronto || 3–4 || Abbotsford || || Ortio || 3,024 || 10–4–0–1 || 21 || Gamesheet
|- style="text-align:center; background:#cfc;"
| 16 || November 10 || Toronto || 3–6 || Abbotsford || || MacDonald || 2,408 || 11–4–0–1 || 23 || Gamesheet
|- style="text-align:center; background:#cfc;"
| 17 || November 13 || Abbotsford || 7–3 || Texas || || Ortio || 4,412 || 12–4–0–1 || 25 || Gamesheet
|- style="text-align:center; background:#cfc;"
| 18 || November 15 || Abbotsford || 5–4 || Oklahoma City || || Ortio || 3,098 || 13–4–0–1 || 27 || Gamesheet
|- style="text-align:center; background:#fcc;"
| 19 || November 16 || Abbotsford || 1–4 || Oklahoma City || || MacDonald || 3,163 || 13–5–0–1 || 27 || Gamesheet
|- style="text-align:center; background:#cfc;"
| 20 || November 19 || Abbotsford || 4–3 || Milwaukee || || Ortio || 2,528 || 14–5–0–1 || 29 || Gamesheet
|- style="text-align:center; background:#cfc;"
| 21 || November 20 || Abbotsford || 4–2 || Rockford || || MacDonald || 2,493 || 15–5–0–1 || 31 || Gamesheet
|- style="text-align:center; background:#cfc;"
| 22 || November 23 || Abbotsford || 4–0 || Iowa || || Ortio || 5,326 || 16–5–0–1 || 33 || Gamesheet
|- style="text-align:center; background:#cfc;"
| 23 || November 24 || Abbotsford || 2–1 || Iowa || || MacDonald || 4,022 || 17–5–0–1 || 35 || Gamesheet
|- style="text-align:center; background:#fcc;"
| 24 || November 29 || Utica || 3–2 || Abbotsford || || Ortio || 4,260 || 17–6–0–1 || 35 || Gamesheet
|- style="text-align:center; background:#ffc;"
| 25 || November 30 || Utica || 4–3 || Abbotsford || OT || MacDonald || 4,984 || 17–6–1–1 || 36 || Gamesheet
|- style="text-align:center; background:;"

|- style="text-align:center; background:#cfc;"
| 26 || December 6 || San Antonio || 2–4 || Abbotsford || || Ortio || 2,780 || 18–6–1–1 || 38 || Gamesheet
|- style="text-align:center; background:#cfc;"
| 27 || December 7 || San Antonio || 2–5 || Abbotsford || || Ortio || 2,142 || 19–6–1–1 || 40 || Gamesheet
|- style="text-align:center; background:#cfc;"
| 28 || December 11 || Iowa || 2–6 || Abbotsford || || Ortio || 1,409 || 20–6–1–1 || 42 || Gamesheet
|- style="text-align:center; background:#fcc;"
| 29 || December 12 || Iowa || 4–2 || Abbotsford || || MacDonald || 1,536 || 20–7–1–1 || 42 || Gamesheet
|- style="text-align:center; background:#fcc;"
| 30 || December 18 || Abbotsford || 2–4 || Utica || || MacDonald || 2,444 || 20–8–1–1 || 42 || Gamesheet
|- style="text-align:center; background:#fcc;"
| 31 || December 20 || Abbotsford || 0–3 || Utica || || Ortio || 3,225 || 20–9–1–1 || 42 || Gamesheet
|- style="text-align:center; background:#cfc;"
| 32 || December 22 || Abbotsford || 3–2 || Hamilton || || Ortio || 4,281 || 21–9–1–1 || 44 || Gamesheet
|- style="text-align:center; background:#cfc;"
| 33 || December 27 || Oklahoma City || 1–5 || Abbotsford || || Ortio || 2,931 || 22–9–1–1 || 46 || Gamesheet
|- style="text-align:center; background:#cfc;"
| 34 || December 28 || Oklahoma City || 2–4 || Abbotsford || || Ortio || 2,149 || 23–9–1–1 || 48 || Gamesheet
|- style="text-align:center; background:;"

|- style="text-align:center; background:#fcc;"
| 35 || January 3 || Hamilton || 2–1 || Abbotsford || || Ortio || 2,638 || 23–10–1–1 || 48 || Gamesheet
|- style="text-align:center; background:#fcc;"
| 36 || January 4 || Hamilton || 3–1 || Abbotsford || || MacDonald || 2,458 || 23–11–1–1 || 48 || Gamesheet
|- style="text-align:center; background:#fcc;"
| 37 || January 7 || Abbotsford || 1–5 || San Antonio || || Ortio || 3,060 || 23–12–1–1 || 48 || Gamesheet
|- style="text-align:center; background:#fcc;"
| 38 || January 10 || Abbotsford || 0–5 || Texas || || MacDonald || 5,628 || 23–13–1–1 || 48 || Gamesheet
|- style="text-align:center; background:#cfc;"
| 39 || January 11 || Abbotsford || 3–2 || San Antonio || || Ortio || 7,461 || 24–13–1–1 || 50 || Gamesheet
|- style="text-align:center; background:#cfc;"
| 40 || January 15 || Abbotsford || 4–3 || Rockford || OT || MacDonald || 2638 || 25–13–1–1 || 52 || Gamesheet
|- style="text-align:center; background:#fcc;"
| 41 || January 17 || Abbotsford || 0–3 || Grand Rapids || || MacDonald || 8,098 || 25–14–1–1 || 52 || Gamesheet
|- style="text-align:center; background:#cfc;"
| 42 || January 18 || Abbotsford || 3–2 || Grand Rapids || || Ortio || 9,170 || 26–14–1–1 || 54 || Gamesheet
|- style="text-align:center; background:#ffc;"
| 43 || January 24 || Utica || 1–0 || Abbotsford || OT || Ortio || 4,396 || 26–14–2–1 || 55 || Gamesheet
|- style="text-align:center; background:#ffc;"
| 44 || January 25 || Utica || 4–3 || Abbotsford || OT || MacDonald || 6,247 || 26–14–3–1 || 56 || Gamesheet
|- style="text-align:center; background:#cfc;"
| 45 || January 31 || Hamilton || 0–6 || Abbotsford || || Ortio || 3,328 || 27–14–3–1 || 58 || Gamesheet
|- style="text-align:center; background:;"

|- style="text-align:center; background:#cfc;"
| 46 || February 1 || Hamilton || 1–4 || Abbotsford || || Ortio || 3,968 || 28–14–3–1 || 60 || Gamesheet
|- style="text-align:center; background:#cfc;"
| 47 || February 4 || Charlotte || 1–7 || Abbotsford || || Roy || 1,790 || 29–14–3–1 || 62 || Gamesheet
|- style="text-align:center; background:#cfc;"
| 48 || February 5 || Charlotte || 3–4 || Abbotsford || || Roy || 1,528 || 30–14–3–1 || 64 || Gamesheet
|- style="text-align:center; background:#cfc;"
| 49 || February 8 || Texas || 2–3 || Abbotsford || || Roy || 3,273 || 31–14–3–1 || 66 || Gamesheet
|- style="text-align:center; background:#fcc;"
| 50 || February 9 || Texas || 7–2 || Abbotsford || || Roy || 2,569 || 31–15–3–1 || 66 || Gamesheet
|- style="text-align:center; background:#cfc;"
| 51 || February 14 || Abbotsford || 5–1 || Charlotte || || Ortio || 4,354 || 32–15–3–1 || 68 || Gamesheet
|- style="text-align:center; background:#ffc;"
| 52 || February 16 || Abbotsford || 4–5 || Charlotte || OT || Ortio || 5,525 || 32–15–4–1 || 69 || Gamesheet
|- style="text-align:center; background:#cfc;"
| 53 || February 21 || Abbotsford || 4–2 || Milwaukee || || Roy || 10,277 || 33–15–4–1 || 71 || Gamesheet
|- style="text-align:center; background:#fcc;"
| 54 || February 22 || Abbotsford || 3–5 || Chicago || || Roy || 13,027 || 33–16–4–1 || 71 || Gamesheet
|- style="text-align:center; background:#fcc;"
| 55 || February 23 || Abbotsford || 0–2 || Chicago || || Dell || 6,335 || 33–17–4–1 || 71 || Gamesheet
|- style="text-align:center; background:#ffc;"
| 56 || February 28 || Grand Rapids || 4–3 || Abbotsford || SO || Roy || 3,068 || 33–17–4–2 || 72 || Gamesheet
|- style="text-align:center; background:;"

|- style="text-align:center; background:#fcc;"
| 57 || March 1 || Grand Rapids || 5–2 || Abbotsford || || MacDonald || 2,774 || 33–18–4–2 || 72 || Gamesheet
|- style="text-align:center; background:#fcc;"
| 58 || March 4 || Texas || 3–1 || Abbotsford || || MacDonald || 6,827 || 33–19–4–2 || 72 || Gamesheet
|- style="text-align:center; background:#ffc;"
| 59 || March 5 || Texas || 4–3 || Abbotsford || OT || Roy || 2,071 || 33–19–5–2 || 73 || Gamesheet
|- style="text-align:center; background:#fcc;"
| 60 || March 8 || Chicago || 7–2 || Abbotsford || || Roy || 3,281 || 33–20–5–2 || 73 || Gamesheet
|- style="text-align:center; background:#fcc;"
| 61 || March 9 || Chicago || 4–1 || Abbotsford || || Roy || 2,286 || 33–21–5–2 || 73 || Gamesheet
|- style="text-align:center; background:#cfc;"
| 62 || March 14 || Utica || 1–3 || Abbotsford || || Roy || 3417 || 34–21–5–2 || 75 || Gamesheet
|- style="text-align:center; background:#fcc;"
| 63 || March 15 || Utica || 3–1 || Abbotsford || || Roy || 3,781 || 34–22–5–2 || 75 || Gamesheet
|- style="text-align:center; background:#fcc;"
| 64 || March 19 || Abbotsford || 1–3 || Hamilton || || Dell || 2,379 || 34–23–5–2 || 75 || Gamesheet
|- style="text-align:center; background:#cfc;"
| 65 || March 22 || Abbotsford || 5–1 || Hamilton || || Dell || 5,344 || 35–23–5–2 || 77 || Gamesheet
|- style="text-align:center; background:#fcc;"
| 66 || March 23 || Abbotsford || 2–3 || Toronto || || Ortio || 4,992 || 35–24–5–2 || 77 || Gamesheet
|- style="text-align:center; background:#cfc;"
| 67 || March 28 || Abbotsford || 2–1 || Utica || OT || Ortio || 3,815 || 36–24–5–2 || 79 || Gamesheet
|- style="text-align:center; background:#cfc;"
| 68 || March 29 || Abbotsford || 7–2 || Utica || || Ortio || 3,815 || 37–24–5–2 || 81 || Gamesheet
|- style="text-align:center; background:#fcc;"
| 69 || March 30 || Abbotsford || 4–6 || Toronto || || Ortio || 5,123 || 37–25–5–2 || 81 || Gamesheet
|- style="text-align:center; background:;"

|- style="text-align:center; background:#cfc;"
| 70 || April 4 || Rockford || 3–6 || Abbotsford || || Ortio || 3,088 || 38–25–5–2 || 83 || Gamesheet
|- style="text-align:center; background:#cfc;"
| 71 || April 5 || Rockford || 3–5 || Abbotsford || || Ortio || 3,276 || 39–25–5–2 || 85 || Gamesheet
|- style="text-align:center; background:#cfc;"
| 72 || April 11 || Oklahoma City || 2–3 || Abbotsford || || Ortio || 3,403 || 40–25–5–2 || 87 || Gamesheet
|- style="text-align:center; background:#ffc;"
| 73 || April 13 || Oklahoma City || 5–4 || Abbotsford || SO || Carr || 5,065 || 40–25–5–3 || 88 || Gamesheet
|- style="text-align:center; background:#cfc;"
| 74 || April 17 || Abbotsford || 3–1 || San Antonio || || Ortio || 9,828 || 41–25–5–3 || 90 || Gamesheet
|- style="text-align:center; background:#cfc;"
| 75 || April 18 || Abbotsford || 3–0 || San Antonio || || Carr || 12,473 || 42–25–5–3 || 92 || Gamesheet
|- style="text-align:center; background:#cfc;"
| 76 || April 19 || Abbotsford || 4–3 || Texas || || Ortio || 6,863 || 43–25–5–3 || 94 || Gamesheet
|- style="text-align:center; background:;"

|-
|
Legend:

Playoffs

Game log 
The Abbotsford Heat entered the Calder Cup playoffs as the 5th seed in the Western Conference. They were eliminated during the WC Quarterfinals in Game 4 against the Grand Rapids Griffins.

|-  style="background:#fcf;"
| 1 || April 25 || Grand Rapids || 2–1 || Abbotsford || OT || Ortio || 2,420 || 0–1 || Recap
|-  style="background:#fcf;"
| 2 || April 26 || Grand Rapids || 7–2 || Abbotsford || || Ortio || 2,154 || 0–2 || Recap
|-  style="background:#cfc;"
| 3 || April 30 || Abbotsford || 2–1 || Grand Rapids || || Ortio || 7,193 || 1–2 || Recap
|-  style="background:#fcf;"
| 4 || May 2 || Abbotsford || 3–5 || Grand Rapids || || Ortio || 7,641 || 1–3 || Recap
|-

|- 
| Legend:       = If needed       = Win       = Loss       = Playoff series win

Player statistics

SkatersNote: GP = Games played; G = Goals; A = Assists; Pts = Points; +/− = Plus/minus; PIM = Penalty minutesUpdated as of June 5, 2014 

†Denotes player spent time with another team before joining team. Stats reflect time with the team only.
‡Left the team mid-season
*Rookie

GoaltendersNote: GP = Games played; TOI = Time on ice; W = Wins; L = Losses; GA = Goals against; GAA = Goals against average; SV = Saves; SA = Shots against; SV% = Save percentage; SO = Shutouts; G = Goals; A = Assists; PIM = Penalty minutes''
Updated as of April 20, 2014

‡Left the team mid-season
*Rookie

Milestones

References

Abbotsford
Abbotsford Heat seasons
Abbotsford
2013 in British Columbia
2014 in British Columbia